Mungar railway station (also known as Mungar Junction railway station) is a closed railway station on the North Coast railway line, Queensland, Australia. It was the station at which the now closed Mungar Junction to Monto railway line branched from the North Coast line, giving it the name Mungar Junction.

References

Disused railway stations in Queensland
North Coast railway line, Queensland
Mungar Junction to Monto railway line